Desmond Broe (1921 – 16 September 1968) was an Irish sculptor.

Life 

His father, Leo, was a sculptor, with the family sculpting business run from a premises in Harold's Cross, Dublin. His sister, Irene, was also a sculptor.

Broe attended the National College of Art and Design, and won the Taylor Scholarship in 1943 for modelling. His work was part of the sculpture event in the art competition at the 1948 Summer Olympics. His work was exhibited alongside his sister and father, as well as May Power, at the 1955 Institute of the Sculptors of Ireland exhibition in the Hugh Lane Gallery. One of his most notable works in a plaque to Patrick and William Pearse, erected on their former home at 27 Pearse Street. He also carved the headstone at the family's burial plot in Deans Grange Cemetery, and the IRA Memorial in Athlone.

Broe's son, Dimitri, took over the family sculpting business which was later known as Monumental Sculptors.

References

External links
 

1921 births
1968 deaths
20th-century Irish sculptors
Male sculptors
20th-century male artists
Irish sculptors
Olympic competitors in art competitions
Artists from Dublin (city)